Australian Birdlife is the quarterly membership magazine of BirdLife Australia, the Australian partner of BirdLife International. It was first issued in 2012, replacing and succeeding both Wingspan, published by Birds Australia, and the Bird Observer, published by Bird Observation and Conservation Australia (BOCA), when the two organisations merged.

Australian Birdlife is a glossy colour magazine that contains articles on wild birds, birding and bird conservation in Australasia and adjacent regions.

References

External links
 

2012 establishments in Australia
English-language magazines
Journals and magazines relating to birding and ornithology
Magazines established in 2012
Magazines published in Melbourne
Quarterly magazines published in Australia
Birdwatching